Country Soul contains recordings of a prestardom Glen Campbell, which were made around 1960-1961. This album, just like the other Starday album Country Music Star No. 1, was released after Glen Campbell rose to international fame with hits like "Gentle on My Mind," "By the Time I Get to Phoenix" and "Wichita Lineman." Campbell sued against these releases but eventually settled with Starday.

Track listing
Side 1:

 "Why Try To Lie" (Horton/Morgan/Bryan) - 2:13
 "Smokey Blue Eyes" (Horton/Morgan/Bryan/Kirkland) - 2:57
 "I'll Always Be Waiting" (Horton/Morgan/Bryan) - 2:25
 "The Love Of A Woman" (Horton/Morgan/Bryan) - 2:28
 "Another Face, Another Place" (Horton/Morgan/Bryan) - 1:47

Side 2:

 "Where Do I Go From Here" (Horton/Morgan/Bryan) - 3:41
 "Remind Me Of You" (Horton/Morgan/Bryan) - 3:49
 "Three's A Crowd" (Horton/Morgan/Bryan) - 2:07
 "My Whole Life Through" (Horton/Morgan/Campbell) - 2:17
 "Something To Remember" (Horton/Morgan/Bryan) - 2:19

Personnel
Glen Campbell - vocals, acoustic guitar

Production
Producer - Don Pierce
Music produced by Thomas R. Morgan
Arrangements - Mark Roberts
Cover design - Dan Quest Art Studio

References

1968 compilation albums
Glen Campbell compilation albums
Starday Records compilation albums